Zainal Abidin bin Sakom (born 14 August 1950) is a Malaysian politician and currently as chairman of Poverty Eradication.

Election Results

Honours

Honours of Malaysia
  :
 Member of the Order of the Defender of the Realm (AMN) (1995)
  :
  Knight Companion of the Order of Sultan Salahuddin Abdul Aziz Shah (DSSA) – Dato' (1996)

References

United Malays National Organisation politicians
Members of the Selangor State Legislative Assembly
Living people
1950 births
People from Selangor
Malaysian people of Malay descent
Malaysian Muslims
Members of the Order of the Defender of the Realm